This is a list of Monuments of National Importance (ASI) as officially recognized by and available through the website of the Archaeological Survey of India in the Indian state West Bengal. The monument identifier is a combination of the abbreviation of the subdivision of the list (state, ASI circle) and the numbering as published on the website of the ASI. 133 Monuments of National Importance have been recognized by the ASI in West Bengal.

List of monuments of national importance 

|}

See also 
 List of Monuments of National Importance in India for other Monuments of National Importance in India
 List of State Protected Monuments in West Bengal

Footnotes and references 

West Bengal
 
Monuments of National Importance
Lists of tourist attractions in West Bengal